San Zenone al Lambro (Milanese:  , locally  ) is a comune (municipality) in the Metropolitan City of Milan in the Italian region Lombardy, located about  southeast of Milan.

San Zenone al Lambro borders the following municipalities: Vizzolo Predabissi, Tavazzano con Villavesco, Cerro al Lambro, Sordio, Lodi Vecchio, Casaletto Lodigiano and Salerano sul Lambro. It is served by San Zenone al Lambro railway station.

References

External links
 Official website

Cities and towns in Lombardy